William Strutt may refer to:
 William Strutt (artist), English-born Australian artist
 William Strutt (inventor), English civil engineer, architect and inventor
 William Strutt (politician), member of the Tasmanian Legislative Council
 William Goodday Strutt, British Army officer, governor of Quebec